The 2005 Grand Prix SAR La Princesse Lalla Meryem was a women's tennis tournament played on outdoor clay courts in Rabat, Morocco that was part of the Tier IV category of the 2005 WTA Tour. It was the fifth edition of the tournament and was held from 2 May until 8 May 2005. Second-seeded Nuria Llagostera Vives won the singles title and earned $22,000 first-prize money.

Finals

Singles
 Nuria Llagostera Vives defeated  Zheng Jie 6–4, 6–2
 It was Llagostera Vives' first singles title of her career.

Doubles
 Émilie Loit /  Barbora Strýcová defeated  Lourdes Domínguez Lino /  Nuria Llagostera Vives 3–6, 7–6(7–5), 7–5

External links
 ITF tournament edition details
 Tournament draws

Grand Prix Sar La Princesse Lalla Meryem
Morocco Open
2005 in Moroccan tennis